I Am Love is the seventh studio album by American recording artist Peabo Bryson, released in 1981 under Capitol Records. The album features singles, "There's No Guarantee" and the top ten R&B hit, "Let the Feeling Flow".

Reception

 
The lead single "Let the Feeling Flow", became Bryson's highest charting pop single at that time. The song reached #42 on Billboards Top Pop Singles. "I Am Love" peaked to #40 on Billboards Top Pop Albums, earning his second top 40 pop album following 1979's "Crosswinds" (at #35).

Track listing
All songs written by Peabo Bryson, "Move Your Body" written by Charles Bryson and Peabo Bryson.

"I Am Love" - 5:08
"Move Your Body" - 4:30   	
"Split Decision" - 5:17	
"Impossible" - 5:49 	
"There's No Guarantee" - 4:30 	
"Love is on the Rise" - 3:52 	
"Let the Feeling Flow" - 4:38 	
"Get Ready to Cry" - 4:17 	
"You" - 4:37

Personnel 
Musicians

 Peabo Bryson – lead and backing vocals, keyboards, acoustic piano, BGV arrangements; horn, rhythm and string arrangements, conductor
 Thomas Campbell – keyboards
 Mark Parrish – synthesizers
 Richard Horton – guitars
 Dwight W. Watkins – bass, backing vocals
 Andre Robinson – drums
 Chuck Bryson – percussion, backing vocals
 Ron Dover – tenor saxophone 
 Daniel Dillard – trombone
 Thaddeus Johnson – trumpet
 Dorothy Ashley – harp
 Johnny Pate – string arrangements and conductor
 Phil Wright – string contractor
 Gerard Vinci – concertmaster
 Terry Dukes – backing vocals

Production

 Peabo Bryson – producer, mixing
 Johnny Pate – producer, mixing
 Rik Pekkonen – engineer
 Ed Seay Jr. – engineer, mixing
 Tommy Cooper – assistant engineer
 Roy Kohara – art direction
 Roland Young – design
 Bobby Holland – photography

Charts

References

External links
[ Allmusic Peabo Bryson]

1981 albums
Peabo Bryson albums
Albums arranged by Johnny Pate
Albums conducted by Johnny Pate
Albums produced by Johnny Pate
Capitol Records albums